Switzerland are the host nation at the 2014 European Athletics Championships in Zürich, Switzerland, held between 12 and 17 August 2014. A delegation of 53 athletes were sent to represent the country.

References

Nations at the 2014 European Athletics Championships
2014
European Athletics Championships